These are the Australian number-one albums of 2006, per the ARIA Charts.

Notes
Number of number one albums: 28
Longest run at number one (during 2006): Back to Bedlam by James Blunt (8 weeks, 4 weeks previously in 2005; 3rd-longest run at #1 on the ARIA Albums Chart in the 2000s)
Human Nature held the #1 position for two albums in the same year, with Reach Out: The Motown Record and Dancing in the Street: the Songs of Motown II.

See also
2006 in music
List of number-one singles in Australia of 2006

References

2006
2006 in Australian music
Australia Albums